The 2020 Campeonato Brasileiro Série D was a football competition held in Brazil, equivalent to the fourth division. The competition was originally scheduled to begin on 3 May and end on 22 November, however due to the COVID-19 pandemic the tournament was rescheduled for 6 September 2020 – 6 February 2021.

Sixty-eight teams competed in the tournament. Sixty-four teams qualified from their state leagues and cups, and four relegated from the 2019 Campeonato Brasileiro Série C (ABC, Atlético Acreano, Globo and Luverdense). Luverdense declined to participate being replaced by Sinop.

The match Guarany de Sobral v Salgueiro, scheduled for 20 September 2020 (Group A3 1st round), was postponed after 12 Guarany de Sobral players tested positive for COVID-19.

In the Group A8 12th round, (14 November 2020), São Caetano players refused to play their away match against Marcílio Dias in protest over unpaid wages. Marcílio Dias was awarded a 3–0 win by forfeit.

Altos, Floresta, Mirassol, and Novorizontino qualified for the semi-finals and were promoted to the 2021 Campeonato Brasileiro Série C.

In the finals, Mirassol defeated Floresta 2–0 on aggregate to win their first title.

Format changes
A preliminary stage was played during this season. In the preliminary stage, eight teams were drawn into four ties, with the winners of each tie advancing to the group stage. The group stage had 64 teams, 60 teams qualified directly and four teams decided in the preliminary stage. The 64 teams were drawn into eight groups of eight teams each. The top four teams of each group qualified for the round of 32.

Teams

Federation ranking
The number of teams from each state was chosen based on the CBF State Ranking.

Participating teams
Teams in italic played the preliminary stage. The teams were:

Competition format
In the preliminary stage, eight teams from the worst ranked federations in the CBF ranking were drawn into four ties, with the winners of each tie advancing to the group stage. In the group stage, the remaining 60 teams and the 4 four teams qualified from the preliminary stage were divided into eight groups of eight organized regionally. Top four teams qualified for the round of 32. From the round of 32 on the competition was played as a knock-out tournament with each round contested over two legs.

Preliminary stage
It was played from 6 to 13 September 2020. The lowest-seeded teams from the eight worst ranked federations in the 2020 CBF ranking (Amazonas, Distrito Federal, Mato Grosso do Sul, Espírito Santo, Tocantins, Rondônia, Amapá, and Roraima) competed to decide four places in the group stage.

Each tie was played on a home-and-away two-legged basis. If tied on aggregate, the away goals rule would not be used, extra time would not be played, and the penalty shoot-out would be used to determine the winners (Regulations Article 18).

Matches

|}

Group stage
In the group stage, each group played on a home-and-away round-robin basis. The teams were ranked according to points (3 points for a win, 1 point for a draw, and 0 points for a loss). If tied on points, the following criteria would be used to determine the ranking: 1. Wins; 2. Goal difference; 3. Goals scored; 4. Head-to-head (if the tie was only between two teams); 5. Fewest red cards; 6. Fewest yellow cards; 7. Draw in the headquarters of the Brazilian Football Confederation (Regulations Article 13).

The top four teams qualified for the round of 32.

Group A1

Group A2

Group A3

Group A4

Group A5

Group A6

Group A7

Group A8

Final stages
The final stages were played on a home-and-away two-legged basis. For the round of 16, semi-finals and finals, the best-overall-performance team hosted the second leg. If tied on aggregate, the away goals rule would not be used, extra time would not be played, and the penalty shoot-out would be used to determine the winners (Regulations Article 18).

For the quarter-finals, teams were seeded based on the table of results of all matches in the competition. The top four seeded teams played the second leg at home.

The four quarter-final winners were promoted to 2021 Série C.

Round of 32
The round of 32 was a two-legged knockout tie, with the draw regionalised. The matches were played from 5 to 13 December 2020.

Matches

|}

Round of 16
The matches were played from 19 to 27 December 2020.

Matches

|}

Quarter-finals
The draw for the quarter-finals was seeded based on the table of results of all matches in the competition (except preliminary stage matches) for the qualifying teams. The teams were ranked according to points. If tied on points, the following criteria would be used to determine the ranking: 1. Wins; 2. Goal difference; 3. Draw in the headquarters of the Brazilian Football Confederation (Regulations Article 15).

Quarter-finals seedings

Seed 3 and seed 4 were decided by a draw held on 28 December 2020, 11:00 at CBF headquarters in Rio de Janeiro.

Matches
The matches were played from 2 to 10 January 2021.

|}

Semi-finals
The matches were played from 16 to 24 January 2021.

Matches

|}

Finals
The matches were played on 30 January and 6 February 2021.

Matches

|}

Top goalscorers

References 

Campeonato Brasileiro Série D seasons
2
Campeonato Brasileiro Série D